A fifth-generation programming language (5GL) is any programming language based on problem-solving using constraints given to the program, rather than using an algorithm written by a programmer. Most constraint-based and logic programming languages and some other declarative languages are fifth-generation languages.

History
While fourth-generation programming languages are designed to build specific programs, fifth-generation languages are designed to make the computer solve a given problem without the programmer. This way, the user only needs to worry about what problems need to be solved and what conditions need to be met, without worrying about how to implement a routine or algorithm to solve them. Fifth-generation languages are used mainly in artificial intelligence research. OPS5 and Mercury are examples of fifth-generation languages, as is ICAD, which was built upon Lisp.  KL-ONE is an example of a related idea, a frame language.

In the 1980s, fifth-generation languages were considered to be the way of the future, and some predicted that they would replace procedural programming with constraint based programming for all tasks that could be framed as a series of logical constraints. Most notably, from 1982 to 1993, Japan put much research and money into their fifth-generation computer systems project, hoping to design a massive computer network of machines using these tools.

However, as larger programs were built, the flaws of the approach became more apparent. It turns out that, given a set of constraints defining a particular problem, deriving an efficient algorithm to solve it is a very difficult problem in itself. This crucial step cannot yet be automated and still requires the insight of a human programmer.

Common misconception
Vendors have been known on occasion to advertise their languages as 5GL. Most of the time they actually sell 4GLs with a higher level of automation and knowledge base. Because the hype of the 1980s faded away and the projects were eventually all dropped, 5GL awareness has also dropped; this has opened doors to the vendors to re-use the term in marketing their new tools, without causing much controversy among the current generations of programmers.

See also
 Constraint programming
 List of programming languages for artificial intelligence
 Programming paradigm

References

Programming language classification